Anterior median may refer to:

 Anterior median fissure of the spinal cord
 Anterior median fissure of the medulla oblongata
 Anterior median line
 Anterior spinal veins also known as anterior median spinal veins